Lesbian, gay, bisexual, and transgender (LGBT) people in Rio Grande do Sul, Brazil enjoy many of the same legal protections available to non-LGBT people. Homosexuality is legal in the state.

Recognition of same-sex unions
On May 29, 2012, four of six notaries of the state capitol of Porto Alegre agreed to convert civil unions into marriages.

LGBT adoption
November 11, 2005 − the first LGBT adoption in Brazil, by a lesbian couple from the city of Bagé. The judge of the Childhood and Youth of Bagé, Marcos Danilo Edon Franco, permitted the adoption of two brothers by a lesbian couple. The women had been living in a stable union for seven years. One of them had been responsible for the guardianship of the boys since their birth.

April 6, 2006 − a second adoption by a lesbian couple, and one "provisional guardianship". Same-sex couples in committed relationships were allowed to register at any notary public office. Although it did not affect federal rights, it gave same-sex couples more equality in many areas. Same-sex couples who register have the right to jointly own property, establish custody of children, and claim the right to pensions and property when one partner dies.

June 10, 2009 − a lesbian couple was the first to win in court the right of adoption in the Brazilian State of Goiás. Since April 2008, a federal employee, 49, and a librarian, 34, had custody of a girl aged two years and ten months. The unprecedented decision was made by Judge Maurício Porfírio of the Juvenile Court of Childhood and Youth in Goiânia. To compensate for the lack of specific law on the issue, the magistrate relied on the precedent of the Court of Rio Grande do Sul.

April 27, 2010 − the Superior Court of Justice of Brazil, located in the capital of the country, Brasília, decided to approve LGBT adoption in Brazil. In the case, a lesbian couple from the city of Bagé the physiotherapist Lídia Brignol Guterres and the psychologist Luciana Reis Maidana, had their right to share the adoption of two sons recognized. They told the state that the decision could become a landmark, and could inspire others to follow suit. The physiotherapist and psychologist had been together for thirteen years and adopted two boys in 2002 and 2003. In official records, the children appeared only as children of Luciana. The couple decided to change the documentation to provide pension rights which apply to minors in cases of separation and inheritance.

June 3, 2011 - the Justice of the city of Pelotas authorized the adoption of a four-year-old child by a gay couple. The biological mother, gave evidence demonstrating a desire to give her child up for adoption by the gay couple.

References

Rio Grande do Sul
Rio Grande do Sul